Baikiaea ghesquiereana is a species of legume in the family Fabaceae. It is found only in Tanzania. It is threatened by habitat loss.

References

Detarioideae
Endemic flora of Tanzania
Trees of Africa
Endangered flora of Africa
Taxonomy articles created by Polbot